Terry Leibel is a Canadian retired journalist and former member of the Canadian Equestrian Team. After her career as an equestrian athlete throughout the 1970s, Leibel was hired by CBC Sports as an equestrian sports analyst. She was the first woman to host a CBC Olympic Games broadcast. She left the CBC for TSN in 1984 where she was the first woman to host a national sports program, SportsDesk, and worked there for two years before returning to the CBC. 

She became the first woman to co-host CBC Sports Olympic coverage during the 1996 Summer Olympic Games in Atlanta, Georgia. She also covered the 2002 and 2006 Winter Olympic Games and the 2004 Summer Olympic Games. She earned Gemini Award nominations for her work in the Atlanta and Sydney Olympics and won a 2003 Gemini Award becoming the first female sports broadcaster to do so. She was also the first woman to do play-by-play for the Olympics, handling cycling, equestrian and white-water events for NBC Sports during the Summer Games in Barcelona in 1992.

Leibel announced her retirement on February 27, 2008. Her final assignment was at Spruce Meadows in June 2008.

References

Canadian female equestrians
Canadian horse racing announcers
Canadian television journalists
Canadian Screen Award winners
Year of birth missing (living people)
Living people
Place of birth missing (living people)
Canadian women television journalists
Pan American Games medalists in equestrian
Pan American Games silver medalists for Canada
Equestrians at the 1979 Pan American Games
Medalists at the 1979 Pan American Games